Vatsal Sheth (born 5 August 1980) is an Indian actor, model and entrepreneur. He has acted in many Indian television shows and numerous Hindi films, and is known for his portrayal of Raj Chaudhary in the 2004 film Taarzan: The Wonder Car, Shaurya Goenka in the 2014 thriller series Ek Hasina Thi, and Kabir Raichand in the 2017 love-saga series Haasil.

Life and family
Sheth was born on 5 August 1980 in Mumbai to Gujarati parents. He is the elder of the two siblings.

He studied at Utpal Shanghvi Global School, did his Junior College at Gokalibai Punamchand Pitambar High School, Vile Parle and received his degree in mathematics from Mithibai College, Vile Parle. He also wrote a few games in GW-BASIC and Pascal. He intended to become a software engineer which he later dropped after receiving his first significant role as Jai in Just Mohabbat.

Sheth is a vegetarian. He is a fitness enthusiast and follows teetotalism. He is a part of the Celebrity Cricket Team Mumbai Heroes. He also plays badminton and supports Mumbai Magicians in the Indian Badminton League.

Personal life
Sheth married his co-star Ishita Dutta on 28 November 2017.

Career
In Just Mohabbat, Sheth portrayed the role of Jai through his teenage years. In 2003, director duo Abbas–Mustan announced their film Taarzan: The Wonder Car with Sheth playing the character Raj Choudary. In 2007, Sheth appeared as Vikram Singh/ Older Jaisalmer in Nanhe Jaisalmer. A year later he starred in  Heroes as Ali . In the same year he appeared in a cameo for Disney’s The Cheetah Girls: One World. In 2009, he was part of the star-cast in Paying Guests produced by Subhash Ghai. In 2011, Vatsal played Karan in Hostel. He had a cameo role in Jai Ho. In 2014 Vatsal returned to television in a grey role of Shaurya Goenka in Ek Hasina Thi. In 2017, he was cast as a lead character Kabir Raichand on the thriller tv series Haasil On 25 January 2018, he won an award for Haasil at the Lions Gold Awards. In December 2019, he appeared as Nishant Maheshwari in the StarPlus daily soap opera Yeh Rishtey Hain Pyaar Ke.

Media 
Vatsal Sheth was ranked in The Times Most Desirable Men at No. 36 in 2020.

Filmography

Television

Films

Music videos

References

External links

 
 Vatsal Sheth on Facebook
 Vatsal Sheth on Instagram
 Vatsal Sheth at Bollywood Hungama
 Vatsal Sheth on Twitter

Living people
Indian male film actors
Mithibai College alumni
1980 births
Male actors in Hindi cinema
Male actors in Telugu cinema
Male actors in Hindi television
Indian male television actors
Male actors from Mumbai
Gujarati people
Gujaratis from Mumbai